Charles Woolcock (died 1891) was a 19th-century Member of Parliament from Westland, New Zealand.

He represented the Grey Valley electorate from 1876 to 1879, when he retired.

References

Year of birth missing
1891 deaths
Members of the New Zealand House of Representatives
New Zealand MPs for South Island electorates
19th-century New Zealand politicians